Thanos is a fictional character portrayed primarily by Josh Brolin via motion capture in the Marvel Cinematic Universe (MCU) media franchise, based on the Marvel Comics supervillain of the same name. Thanos is depicted as an alien warlord from the doomed planet Titan with a Malthusian mindset and galactic-spanning genocidal agenda. His primary goal is to obtain the six Infinity Stones, cosmic gems with the power to stabilize the universe's overpopulation and prevent what he views as its inevitable demise. With the help of his adopted children and after the Infinity War primarily against the Avengers and the Guardians of the Galaxy, and their allies, Thanos is successful in assembling the Stones within his Infinity Gauntlet and committing the Blip, which disintegrates half of all life in the universe. He then atomizes the Stones and retires, but is eventually killed by Thor.

Thanos is a key figure in the MCU's Infinity Saga, having appeared in five films, most notably in Avengers: Infinity War (2018) and Avengers: Endgame (2019).

Several versions of Thanos from within the MCU multiverse also appear in Endgame, the Disney+ animated series What If...? (2021–present), and the Phase Four film Doctor Strange in the Multiverse of Madness (2022).

The character has been well received by critics and fans alike. Thanos is often credited as one of the MCU's best villains, as well as one of the greatest film villains of all time.

Fictional character biography

Early life 
Thanos is born approximately 1,000 years ago on the planet Titan to A'Lars, along with his brother Eros. Eventually Thanos comes to realize that the growth of Titan's population will inevitably result in its downfall due to lack a of resources, and so he proposes to kill half of the planet's population at random. However, his people reject his solution as pure madness and cast him out. Over time, Thanos' prediction come to pass, and he witnesses the death of his people until he is the only surviving member of the Titan race.

Balancing the universe 
Thanos concludes that other planets would eventually suffer the same fate as Titan, and believes that it is his destiny to eliminate half of the universe's population so that the survivors may thrive. To realize his "great plan", he takes command of a warship, the Sanctuary II, and embarks on a campaign of conquest and genocide. He becomes recognized and greatly feared for his power and influence. Thanos also takes control of various armies, including the Chitauri, the Sakaarans, and the Outriders. He forges alliances with the Other and Ronan the Accuser. Additionally, he occasionally adopts orphan children from planets he invades, including Gamora, Nebula, Ebony Maw, Corvus Glaive, Cull Obsidian, and Proxima Midnight. Thanos gives special attention to Gamora, whom he considers his favorite. Eventually Thanos learns of the six Infinity Stones and embarks on a mission to collect them in order to use them to fulfill his mission instantaneously. Prior to 2012, he finds the Mind Stone and places it within a scepter.

In 2012, Thanos directs the Other to form an alliance with Loki, and provides him with the Mind Stone scepter and the Chitauri army to subjugate Earth in exchange for the retrieval of the Space Stone within the Tesseract. Following Loki's defeat by the Avengers and the loss of the Mind Stone, the Other reports about the failed attack on Earth to Thanos.

In 2014, Thanos locates the Power Stone and sends Ronan, Gamora, and Nebula to retrieve it. However, all three betray him: Gamora joins the Guardians of the Galaxy, Ronan decides to keep the Power Stone for himself and renounces his alliance with Thanos, and Nebula sides with Ronan when he vows to kill Thanos after destroying Xandar. The Guardians of the Galaxy defeat Ronan and leave the Power Stone with the Nova Corps.

In 2015, Thanos arrives on Nidavellir and forces the native Dwarves to forge the Infinity Gauntlet to hold all six Stones, before killing all of them, except for Eitri. Thanos is angered at his recruits' failures, so he dons the Gauntlet and vows to find the Stones himself.

The Blip 
In 2018, Thanos is accompanied by his children and they decimate Xandar to retrieve the Power Stone. Shortly after, they intercept the Statesman, carrying Asgardian refugees following their world's destruction, and kills half of them, while also incapacitating Thor. Thanos attempts to barter the Tesseract from Loki in exchange for Thor's life, but Thanos is attacked by the Hulk, whom he easily defeats. After Heimdall saves Hulk, Thanos kills him. He then destroys the Tesseract, obtaining the Space Stone inside, and orders his children to retrieve the Mind and Time Stone on Earth before rendezvousing with him on Titan. After killing Loki, Thanos destroys the Statesman, and teleports himself and his children away; unknowingly leaving Thor alive.

Thanos travels to Knowhere and obtains the Reality Stone from Taneleer Tivan. The Guardians of the Galaxy: Peter Quill, Drax, Mantis, and Gamora arrive to try and stop him. Thanos uses the Reality Stone to quickly defeat them before capturing Gamora and teleporting away with her. Knowing she had learned the location of the Soul Stone, he coerces her into revealing it to him in exchange for sparing Nebula, whom he has captured and has been torturing. Thanos and Gamora travel to Vormir, where the Soul Stone's keeper, Johann Schmidt, informs them that the Soul Stone requires the sacrifice of a loved one, requiring Thanos to tearfully throw Gamora off a cliff to her death.

Thanos arrives on Titan expecting to meet Ebony Maw, but instead encounters Stephen Strange and learns that Maw has been killed. Thanos is then ambushed by Tony Stark, Peter Parker, Quill, Drax, and Mantis. A battle ensues, and Nebula also arrives to fight him. Thanos is briefly incapacitated by their combined efforts but before Stark and Parker can remove the Infinity Gauntlet from his hand, Nebula realizes that he murdered Gamora, leading Quill to impulsively attack him in a fit of rage. Thanos breaks free of their hold and overpowers them. After stabbing Stark, he prepares to kill him, but is stopped by Strange, who barters the Time Stone in exchange for sparing Stark's life.

In Wakanda, Cull Obsidian, Proxima Midnight, and Corvus Glaive launch an invasion, but fail to retrieve the Mind Stone and perish in the ensuing battle. Thanos teleports to Wakanda and encounters resistance from the Avengers and their allies: Steve Rogers, Bruce Banner, Natasha Romanoff, Bucky Barnes, Sam Wilson, James Rhodes, T'Challa, Okoye, and Groot. He effortlessly overpowers them as he prepares to take the Mind Stone from Vision. Wanda Maximoff is able to hold him off for a few moments as she kills Vision in order to destroy the Mind Stone. However, Thanos uses the Time Stone to reverse her actions; he tears the Mind Stone from Vision's head, killing him. Thanos knocks Maximoff out and places the final Stone in his Gauntlet. However, he is pierced in the chest by Thor's axe, Stormbreaker.  Badly wounded, Thanos is taunted by a vengeful Thor but manages to snap his fingers, successfully decimating half of all life in the universe. With his mission complete, he teleports away to the Garden, where he rests.

Death 
Twenty-three days later, Thanos, now living on the Garden, is ambushed by Rogers, Romanoff, Thor, Rhodes, Banner, Carol Danvers, Rocket Raccoon, and Nebula who seek to obtain the Stones to reverse his actions. They manage to subdue him and Thor cuts off his left arm, only to find the Gauntlet empty. Thanos reveals that he used the Stones to destroy the Stones in order to avoid the temptation of using them further and to prevent his mission from ever being undone, prompting Thor to decapitate him.

Legacy
Thanos' actions have a universal impact, and the surviving Avengers work to quell the chaos he caused on Earth and other planets until finally undoing his actions five years later in 2023.

Maximoff has flashbacks of Thanos deactivating Vision, and in her extreme grief, has a mental breakdown and unknowingly creates a false reality.

Ajak, leader of the Eternals, informs Ikaris that when Thanos erased half of all life in the universe, he inadvertently delayed the Emergence, saving the Earth and many other planets from complete destruction. She further explains that when the Avengers restored the population, it created the necessary conditions for the Emergence, but also convinces her that the Earth deserves saving. After the Eternals stop the Emergence and some of them prepare to locate others of their kind spread across the universe, their ship is boarded by Eros, brother of Thanos.

The sudden return of the population has a drastic impact as well, such as on Earth, where its governments attempt to reintegrate the Blipped population. This causes socioeconomic conflicts and entities like the Flag Smashers who believe that Thanos was right. They feel that life was better during the Blip and use terrorism to prevent forced repatriation. Additionally, the phrase "Thanos was right" is observed in popular human culture. People graffiti the phrase in public spaces and use it on merchandise for profit.

In New Asgard, fresh on their mind about Thanos, Valkyrie and Miek attend the grand opening of "Infinity Conez" which sells ice cream cones with candy around the top of the ice cream to represent each Infinity Stone.

Alternate versions

Destruction of Earth 
In an alternate 2018, after learning of Thanos' assault on Earth and assuming he will be the cause of its prophesied destruction in his timeline, a gravitonium-infused Glenn Talbot, having become increasingly narcissistic and unhinged under the corrupting influence of the gravitonium and believing he can save the world from Thanos himself, attempts to draw more gravitonium from the core of the Earth to increase his power. He inadvertently destroys the Earth and everyone on it, including Thanos, and fulfilling the prophecy he intended to avert.

Battle of Earth 
In an alternate 2014, Thanos, after conquering a planet, dispatches Gamora and Nebula to Ronan's ship to retrieve the Power Stone. However, he becomes aware of the Avengers using time travel when Nebula alerts him to the arrival of her future self. Thanos then extracts the memories of 2023-Nebula via 2014-Nebula's consciousness. He learns that his future self succeeded and that the Avengers killed him, and are attempting to undo his work. He has the 2014-Nebula impersonate her future self and travel to 2023 so that she can use the Quantum Realm to bring Thanos and his army there.

The Avengers successfully obtain the Stones and revive Thanos' victims in 2023. Immediately afterward, Thanos, within his ship Sanctuary II, exits the Quantum Realm and opens fire on the Avengers Compound, destroying it. While his army searches for the Stones, Thanos engages in an intense fight with Stark, Rogers, and Thor, during which he declares that the Avengers' mission to undo his deceased future self's work has hardened his resolve, and that for the universe to be truly balanced, all of existence must be destroyed, rebuilt anew, and repopulated with life that only knows gratitude.

Thanos defeats Stark and Thor, leaving only Rogers left standing. He calls forth his entire army but the restored Avengers, Guardians, Wakandan and Asgardian armies, the Masters of the Mystic Arts, and the Ravagers arrive and engage Thanos and his army in a final battle. After an intense struggle, Thanos obtains the Stark Nano Gauntlet, but Stark is able to distract him long enough to steal back the Stones from the gauntlet. The warlord can only watch on as Stark snaps his fingers. Though Thanos and his army are erased from existence, and it ends in the Avengers' winning the battle, using the Nano Gauntlet also resulted in Stark losing his life.

What If...? 
Several alternate versions of Thanos appear in the animated series What If...?, with Brolin reprising his role.

Joining the Ravagers 

In an alternate reality, Star-Lord T'Challa convinces Thanos to change his ways and join the Ravagers by claiming that there are other ways to preserve the universe's known resources. A running gag is that Korath the Pursuer called Thanos by the name of "Captain Genocide". Thanos participates in their mission against the Collector in 2008 where he fights Cull Obsidian and Proxima Midnight, who, in this reality, are no longer at his service after the Collector fills the power vacuum and becomes the kingpin of the intergalactic underworld after Thanos joins the Ravagers. Instead, they become the Collector's private security force along with Ebony Maw and Corvus Glaive. Thanos later engages in battle against Cull Obsidian and Proxima Midnight. Following the Collector's defeat, Thanos and the Ravagers travel to Wakanda where Thanos engages in a conversation with Okoye about his former plan to kill half of the universe.

Zombie outbreak 
In an alternate 2018, Thanos arrives on Earth in Wakanda with a nearly complete Infinity Gauntlet, but is infected by a quantum virus and transforms into a zombie.

Killed by Ultron 
In an alternate reality, Thanos arrives on Earth to retrieve the Mind Stone after collecting the other Infinity Stones, but is swiftly killed by Ultron who uses a laser attack to slice him in half. Ultron then proceeds to take the Stones for himself and sets about to kill all life in the Multiverse.

Killed by Gamora 
In an alternate reality, Thanos is killed by Gamora who claims his warlord position, armor, and blade.

Earth-838 
In an alternate reality, Thanos is killed on Titan by the Illuminati, who use the power of the Book of Vishanti to impale him with his own double-edged sword.

Concept and creation

Background and development 
Jim Starlin conceived Thanos during a college psychology course and introduced him as a villain in The Invincible Iron Man #55 (February 1973). Starlin originally designed the character as skinny and lanky, but editor Roy Thomas suggested he "beef him up". In the comics, Thanos is a mutant member of the race of superhumans known as the Titanian Eternals. The character possesses abilities common to the Eternals, and is able to demonstrate enormous superhuman strength, speed, stamina, and invulnerability among other qualities.

Casting and appearances 

The MCU began building towards Thanos in The Avengers (2012), in which Damion Poitier portrayed the character in an uncredited cameo appearance. It was Joss Whedon's idea to include Thanos in the film as his only instructions from Kevin Feige were that the film's villains should be aliens, and the rest was up to Whedon. In May 2014, Josh Brolin signed a multi-film contract to portray the antagonist, debuting in Guardians of the Galaxy (2014). Thanos was originally going to have a larger role in the film, but Whedon felt that the character needed to be threaded more gently. Screenwriters Christopher Markus and Stephen McFeely noted that Thanos' lingering presence in the franchise helped legitimize him as a threat prior to Avengers: Infinity War (2018). Despite this, little screen time had been devoted to Thanos' history and motivations. Markus stated, "We don't get an element of surprise [with his introduction in Infinity War]... You can count on a lot of scenes where we illuminate a lot about him very early", with McFeely adding, "It is incumbent upon us to give him a real story, real stakes, real personality, and a real point of view".

Infinity War went through numerous story iterations, and over the course of development Thanos' presence in the film grew. VFX Supervisor Dan Deleeuw noted "Thanos went from supporting villain to one of the main characters driving the plot". In one draft, the film was told directly from Thanos' perspective with him serving as narrator. Exploring more of Thanos' backstory via flashbacks was considered at one point, but only concept art was created and no scenes were filmed involving a younger Thanos. Despite leading the cast in screen time in Infinity War and being considered the main character of the film by many, Thanos had a secondary role in Avengers: Endgame (2019). McFeely explained "we had to give ourselves permission to backseat the villain [...] You're rolling around in the loss and the time heist, and you think it's sort of Avengers against nature". Joe Russo stated that after Thanos was successful in Infinity War, he is now "done. He did it. He's retired". Markus and McFeely had difficulty in factoring the older, post-Infinity War, Thanos into the film due to the character already possessing the Infinity Stones, until executive producer Trinh Tran suggested that they kill Thanos in the film's first act. Markus explained that the character's early death "reinforced Thanos' agenda. He was done ... it was like, 'If I've got to die, I can die now'".

Archival footage of Thanos killing Loki in Infinity War is shown in a scene of the first episode of the Disney+ TV series Loki in a scene showing Loki what his future would have looked like.

Characterization 
A major aspect of Thanos' comic book storyline is his attempts to woo the female manifestation of Death. This plot was omitted from the films, as the filmmakers instead chose to pair the character with Gamora and focus on their father-daughter relationship. McFeely explained this choice by noting that Thanos and Gamora had a lot of history that they wanted to explore, which would add layers to Thanos to avoid him becoming "the big mustache-twisting bad guy who wants ultimate power just to take over the world and sit on a throne." Avoiding the Death storyline moved away from the tease Whedon used in The Avengers with the character, where Thanos felt that by challenging the Avengers, he was courting death. Though the tease was purposely ambiguous, Whedon felt when he featured Thanos, he did not know what to do with him, feeling that he hung Thanos out to dry. Whedon added that "I love Thanos. I love his apocalyptic vision, his love affair with death. I love his power. But, I don't really understand it". Whedon enjoyed the approach the writers and Russos took in Infinity War, giving Thanos "an actual perspective and [making] him feel righteous to himself", since the Death storyline would not necessarily translate well.

Even when not using the Infinity Stones, Thanos is shown to be a skilled physical fighter, defeating the Hulk in hand to hand combat in Infinity War and wielding a double glaive in combat in Endgame. He also possesses superhuman strength, speed, and stamina.

Design and special effects 

Digital Domain worked on creating Thanos for Infinity War and Endgame, producing over 400 visual effects shots. The company created a new facial capture application called Masquerade, based on the concept of machine learning through computer algorithms, specifically for the film, beginning work on the system 3–4 months before filming began to develop and test it. They presented their results to Brolin, the Russos, and executives from Marvel ahead of filming to demonstrate the subtleties Brolin would be able to bring to the character, which helped inform Brolin on how to portray the character. Before the start of filming, Brolin's facial expressions were captured with ILM's Medusa system, which along with his motion capture data from set, were fed to Masquerade to "create a higher-resolution version of what Brolin did on set" so animators could apply that to the CGI character. Digital Design considered having "snap" briefly pop up on screen when Thanos snapped his fingers as a reference to how the snap occurred in the "Infinity Gauntlet" comic. Port said "as a fun aside, we explored the idea of lifting the actual graphic from the frame of the comic showing the snap, the little yellow action triangles for a single frame of the moment of the snap. They appreciated the idea but didn't ultimately go for it".

Physical appearance changes 

Thanos' design changed drastically between his first appearance in The Avengers and his larger role in Infinity War. With Brolin's first appearance in Guardians of the Galaxy, motion capture technology was used to capture Brolin's facial features, with Thanos' skin also being changed to a darker shade of purple than it was in The Avengers. Advancements in CGI and motion capture technology allowed for the use of more of Brolin's features in Infinity War and Endgame, while also once again changing the shade of purple for Thanos' skin with it becoming more of a lighter purple. In earlier appearances, Thanos had four scars on his cheeks and eleven lines on his chin, but the number of scars was reduced to three and the number of chin lines was reduced to nine with his Infinity War design update. Kelly Port, Digital Domain's VFX Supervisor, noted the design of Thanos took into account the versions that appeared in previous films but were adjusted more towards Brolin's features, which also helped with matching his performance to the digital character.

Portrayal 
Brolin stated that he based his portrayal of Thanos by taking inspiration from Marlon Brando's performance as Colonel Kurtz in Apocalypse Now (1979), saying in an interview in October 2020; "I mentioned Brando in Apocalypse Now. [Kurtz] who is very elusive and insane but what he is saying makes sense and is poetical". He also added; "I started seeing the parallel which I liked for me. I loved being able to resort to a film like Apocalypse Now when I was doing something like Avengers".

Reception 

The MCU's rendition of Thanos has received critical acclaim, being regarded as one of the best MCU villains to date, as well as one of the greatest film villains of all-time. In 2022, WatchMojo named Thanos the 10th greatest film villain of all-time. He has also been regarded as one of the best villains of the 2010s and the 21st century so far. Owen Gleiberman of Variety called Brolin's performance "supremely effective" and said, "Brolin infuses Thanos with his slit-eyed manipulative glower, so that the evil in this movie never feels less than personal". The Hollywood Reporters Todd McCarthy echoed this sentiment, saying "Brolin's calm, considered reading of the character bestows this conquering beast with an unexpectedly resonant emotional dimension, making him much more than a thick stick figure of a supervillain". Writing for IGN, Scott Collua pointed out that audiences "understand his perspective and believe his pain", making the antagonist surprisingly sympathetic. Peter Travers of Rolling Stone praised both the character and Brolin: "[Thanos is] thunderously voiced by a dynamite Josh Brolin in a motion capture performance that radiates ferocity and unexpected feeling". The Atlantic called Thanos an "unexpectedly resonant monster, filled with sadness and even a perverse sense of honor".

Critics noted that Thanos was a significant improvement over previous antagonists in the franchise. According to Screen Rant, the MCU struggled to create captivating antagonists throughout its first two phases. However, this changed in Phase Three with well-received villains such as Killmonger and Vulture, culminating in Thanos, whose "repudiation of the MCU's narrative worship of its heroes creates a deep uncertainty in our expectation that follows through each encounter toward the inevitable, horrifying conclusion". George Marston attributed Thanos' success to "the weight behind his character. Like the best villains in media, Thanos sees himself as a hero. It's the power of Brolin's performance that begins to draw viewers into that maniacal goal over and over, almost making Thanos seem likable or perhaps even reasonable, before the utter horror of him actually accomplishing his goal kicks in". Similarly, The Washington Post declared Thanos Marvel's most compelling villain due to his "deep, reflective intelligence" as well as his "profound adherence to his belief system".

Some fans criticized Thanos' portrayal in Endgame, feeling that the 2014 variant of him was more openly villainous compared to what was established in Infinity War, saying that he ended up "swapping his unusual plan of balancing the population with a less evocative idea of destroying then reforming the galaxy". Screen Rant felt that once Thanos learned of the Avengers' plot to reverse what his older self had done, he "regresses by falling back upon a one-dimensional aim to just destroy the universe wholesale", which made him seem more like a "generic big bad" in the film. The site argued that his lack of history with the Avengers resulted in the nuances and connections being lost, which was most notable in his climatic battle with Maximoff as she still had Vision's death freshly on her mind, but Thanos dismisses her because at that point in his life he hadn't killed Vision.

In 2017, after comic book writer Jim Starlin expressed dissatisfaction with Marvel's pay for his Guardians of the Galaxy characters, including Thanos, Gamora, and Drax, Disney readjusted his agreement for Thanos' appearance in Infinity War and Endgame.

Cultural impact 

Thanos and his "snap" spawned much audience enthusiasm. The website, DidThanosKill.Me was created for fans to see if they would have been spared by Thanos or not. The ending of Infinity War also spawned the creation of the Reddit subreddit, /r/thanosdidnothingwrong. A user within the subreddit suggested that half of the approximately 20,000 subscribers at the time be banned from the subreddit, in order to mimic the events of the film. After the community agreed to the measure, the moderators approached Reddit's administrators to see if the mass ban would be possible. Once the administrators agreed to the random ban of half the subscribers, it was set to occur on July 9, 2018. Notice of the impending ban made the subreddit's subscribers increase to over 700,000, including both of the Russo brothers. Ahead of the ban, Brolin posted a video saying "Here we go, Reddit users", and ending it with a snap. Over 60,000 people watched a live Twitch stream of the ban occurring, which lasted several hours. The ban of over 300,000 accounts, which included Anthony Russo, was the largest in Reddit's history. Those banned then gathered in the new subreddit, /r/inthesoulstone. One Reddit user who participated described the ban as embodying "the spirit of the Internet" with people "banding together, en masse, around something relatively meaningless but somehow decidedly awesome and hilarious". Andrew Tigani of Screen Rant said this showed "how impactful the film has already become to pop culture. It is also a testament to how valuable fan interaction can be via social media".

A popular tongue-in-cheek fan theory regarding Thanos' defeat in Endgame before the film's release, jokingly referred to by the portmanteau "Thanus", claimed that Thanos would be killed by Ant-Man entering his anus and then expanding himself, blowing off Thanos' body. This theory became a widespread Internet meme. After the film was released and proved the theory wrong, Christopher Markus revealed that due to the strong nature of the Titans, Ant-Man would have been unable to expand himself and would simply be crushed against the walls of Thanos' rectum. In 2022, The Boys showrunner Eric Kripke confirmed that a character introduced in season three, Termite, was a parody of Ant-Man, and his actions of killing people by shrinking to enter their bodies and expanding was partially inspired by the Internet memes about Ant-Man entering Thanos' rectum.

Following the premiere of Endgame, Google included a clickable icon of the Infinity Gauntlet in Google Search results for "Thanos" or "Infinity Gauntlet" as an Easter egg. The icon, when clicked, made a finger-snapping motion before half of the search results disappeared, akin to the disappearance of characters following the Blip.

During the 2020 United States presidential election campaign, a Twitter account affiliated with the 2020 Trump campaign posted an Internet meme of then-incumbent U.S. President Donald Trump superimposed on a clip of Thanos declaring himself "inevitable" in Endgame, with the meme reposted by Trump's own Instagram account. Thanos creator Jim Starlin subsequently criticized Trump, saying he "actually enjoys comparing himself to a mass murderer". In August 2020 Starlin revealed a new villain for an issue of Dreadstar Returns named King Plunddo Tram that heavily resembled Trump, with Plunddo Tram being an anagram of Donald Trump. In the issue, Tram is beheaded, with Starlin saying "a certain politician using a character of mine in one of his political ads may have riled me a bit. I figured he was open game at that point".

In March 2021, to congratulate James Cameron on Avatar regaining the title as the number one film of all-time at the worldwide box office over Endgame, the Russo brothers used an image with Thanos' armor scarecrow and the Avengers' logo dusting away into the Avatar logo.

In other media 
 In the "couch gag" of season 30, episode 12 of The Simpsons, Thanos occupies the family couch and uses the Infinity Gauntlet to wipe out all of the Simpson family except for Maggie.
 Thanos' name appears on a guest list in The Simpsons short Plusaversary.
 In Deadpool 2 (2018), Deadpool mockingly calls Cable "Thanos" as both characters are played by Josh Brolin.
 In 2018, the video game Fortnite featured a mode where players were able to play as Thanos for a limited period. In 2021, Thanos became a cosmetic outfit available for purchase.
 An alternate version of Thanos, "King Thanos", will serve as the main antagonist of a multiverse-centric attraction at Avengers Campus at Disney California Adventure.

Accolades

Merchandise 
Several toys have been released since Thanos' Guardians of the Galaxy appearance. For the film, Hot Toys released a figure of Thanos with his throne, while Funko released two variants of a Funko Pop, including one that glows in the dark. The toy and merchandise gates burst open with the release of Infinity War. Hot Toys released a figure of Thanos and a 1:1 scale Infinity Gauntlet, while Funko released a variety of Pops, including multiple variations of regular sized figures, as well as a 10 inch jumbo Pop. Pops after the film released included a set of six chrome figures each in the color of one of the Infinity Stones and movie moments featuring Thanos vs. Captain America and Thor respectively. Funko has also included a variety of Thanos items in their Marvel Collector Corps subscription boxes, including the Infinity War box, which included a Pop of Thanos in Sanctuary II, a keycap, and an Infinity Gauntlet mug. LEGO released a BrickHeadz and a traditional set featuring Iron Man, Star-Lord, and Gamora minifigs alongside a Thanos bigfig, while Hasbro released a five pack of Marvel Legends with Thanos and his children. Hot Toys released two figures of Thanos after Endgame; a regular version which came with the Infinity Gauntlet and a battle damaged version that came with the Nano Gauntlet. Like with the initial wave of figures for Infinity War, Funko released both a regular sized and a 10 inch tall Thanos, while Pops after the film released included Thanos in his Garden attire. After the season one finale of What If...?, Funko announced a Ravager Thanos Pop.

A variety of Thanos related toys were released for both Marvel Studios' tenth anniversary and the Infinity Saga. For the anniversary, Funko released an updated version of Thanos from Guardians of the Galaxy, this time with him sitting on his throne. To celebrate the Infinity Saga, Funko released a Thanos Pop using the colors of the Infinity Stones, while LEGO released multiple sets, including two sets for Endgames final battle. One included Sanctuary II and the other was set at the Avengers' Compound. LEGO also released an Infinity Gauntlet with articulating fingers, allowing for builders to put it in a snapping pose, while Hasbro released a Marvel Legends two pack featuring a battle damaged Iron Man in his mark LXXXV armor and a battle damaged Thanos.

Entertainment Weekly released an issue of their magazine for Infinity War featuring  Thanos on the cover and a cover story interview with Brolin. Empire had two covers for each of Infinity War and Endgame featuring Thanos; one available to the general public and one that was exclusive to subscribers. Many posters were available for purchase including the theatrical posters for Infinity War and Endgame which both featured Thanos. Other posters included one exclusive to Odeon Cinemas and one featuring the children of Thanos. Limited edition posters were released for Marvel Studios' tenth anniversary, as well as to celebrate the Infinity Saga with posters for the four Avengers films. Two posters were released for the tenth anniversary, one including the heroes and one for Thanos and the other villains. For the Avengers posters, Thanos was prominently included on the Infinity War and Endgame versions. Other pieces of merchandise include Fatheads, apparel, accessories, art books, and a variety of Infinity Gauntlet items.

See also 
Characters of the Marvel Cinematic Universe

Notes

References

External links 
 Thanos on the Marvel Cinematic Universe Wiki
 
 Thanos on Marvel.com

Avengers (film series)
Characters created by Joss Whedon
Fictional characters displaced in time
Fictional characters who can manipulate reality
Fictional characters who can manipulate time
Fictional characters with superhuman durability or invulnerability
Fictional commanders
Fictional dictators
Fictional filicides
Fictional genocide perpetrators
Fictional mass murderers
Fictional murdered people
Fictional swordfighters
Fictional torturers and interrogators
Fictional warlords
Film and television memes
Film characters introduced in 2012
Film supervillains
Galactic emperors
Internet memes introduced in 2018
Internet memes
Male film villains
Marvel Cinematic Universe characters
Marvel Comics characters with superhuman strength
Marvel Comics extraterrestrial supervillains